Gino Iseppi (born 6 October 1957) is an Italian rower. He competed at the 1976 Summer Olympics and the 1984 Summer Olympics.

References

1957 births
Living people
Italian male rowers
Olympic rowers of Italy
Rowers at the 1976 Summer Olympics
Rowers at the 1984 Summer Olympics
Sportspeople from Turin